Ghali Umar Na'Abba (born 27 September 1958) is a Nigerian politician and former Speaker of the House.

Background 
Ghali Umar Na’Abba CFR was born into the family of Alhaji Umar Na’Abba, a businessman in Tudun Wada, Kano City, Kano Municipal Local Government on 27 September 1958. His father was a firm disciplinarian and an Islamic scholar. His father taught him virtues of hard work, entrepreneurship, forthrightness, audacity, sincerity, dynamism, liberal disposition, prudence, modesty and strong religious inclination.

Education

In training, practice and expertise, Na’Abba is a political scientist and a policy architect. He obtained a bachelor's degree in Political Science from the Ahmadu Bello University, Zaria in 1979.  His early education was at Jakara Primary School, Kano where he obtained his First School Leaving Certificate in 1969. He later attended Rumfa College, Kano for his West African School Certificate and was also at School of Preliminary Studies, Kano, between 1974 and 1976, before gaining admission into Ahmadu Bello University, Zaria in October, 1976.

He completed a postgraduate programme on Leadership and Good Governance at the Kennedy School of Government, Harvard University in the United States in 2004. He served as Speaker of the House, and led several international bodies on parliament at the wake of the millennium.

He has also attended, chaired and presented papers at several international seminars, conferences on politics, parliament, development and good governance.  Among them were Conference of Presiding Officers of National Parliaments held in New York in 2000; West African Speakers Conferences held in 2000 and 2001 in Ouagadougou and Abuja respectively; Commonwealth Parliamentary Association annual conferences held variously in 1999, 2000, 2001 at Trinidad and Tobago, London and Melbourne, Australia and several others.

Private sector experience
After his university education and a one-year compulsory National Youth Service, prior to his branch into politics, Ghali, in 1980 joined his father's chain of companies. His business interests ranged from importation of goods, manufacturing to publishing. Thus, at first he became, Secretary, Na’Abba Commercial Trading Company Limited and Later:

 Managing Director, Manifold Limited
 Director, Quick Prints Limited
 Managing Director, Hinterland Resources Limited

Political ascendancy 
As a Political Science student of Ahmadu Bello University, Zaria, he was elected as an executive committee member of the ABU chapter of the revolutionary People's Redemption Party established in the Second Republic by the maverick politician, Mallam Aminu Kano. As a student of Mallam Aminu school of good governance, nation building and transparency in politics he became a notable politician in Kano state and Nigeria in general.

He joined the Peoples Democratic Party (PDP) in 1998 during its formative period. He emerged the party's candidate in April 1999 National Assembly election in Kano Municipal Federal Constituency of Kano state and won the election to represent the Federal constituency in the House of Representatives. With the victory and support of other House members-elect from Kano and North West geo-political zone, he pursued the role as Speaker of the House. Although he amassed substantial support from his colleagues and party leaders, he bowed to counsel and conceded to Ibrahim Salisu Buhari, who later emerged as first Speaker of Fourth Republic House of Representatives. He was thus appointed the House Committee Chairman on Appropriations.

Buhari's tenure was short-lived. Following his resignation due to certain misdemeanors, the House was thus faced with the arduous challenge of electing a leader that has the capacity and political will and skill of instilling sanity in the House, restoring its integrity and designing and pursuing veritable legislative framework. The mantle of leadership fittingly fell on Ghali Umar Na’Abba. The House collectively struck an unprecedented consensus and made Ghali the Speaker.

Speaker of the House of Representatives 
Na'Abba is often praised as an influential Speaker of the House. This is on account of his courage, dynamism, constructive outspokenness, resolute pursuit for legislative independence and revolutionary approach towards the running of the House during his era as speaker. Upon election as speaker, Na’Abba made clear his broad roadmap. These include;

 Robust defence of the independence of the legislature 
 Commitment to the concept of separation of powers 
 Protection of the rule of law and the constitution of the Federal Republic of Nigeria
 Designing and actualization of effective legislative framework
 Driving realistic legislative governance to resonate good governance and quality national development
 Passage of good laws, resolutions and policies to essentially provoke people-focused development
 Efficient management of public fund through healthy budgetary regime that holds full budget implementation in high premium
 Pursuit of enhanced service delivery; curtailing of government waste and scaling down to the minimum, the rate of corruption in public places 
 Holding the executive arm of government fully accountable to the people

To ensure a successful accomplishment of the above enumerated goals Na’Abba, working in a close knit with other principal officers of the House with Hon Chibudom Nwuche as his Deputy embarked on the following measures;

 Putting in place critical pillars and mechanisms that resulted in effective take-off of a parliament that was non-existent for 16 years following military interregnum
 Designing a four-year revolutionary but realizable legislative agenda code named; House Contract with Nigeria. House Contract with Nigeria which was launched by Na’Abba-led House with fanfare and resolve contained specific details of activities, programmes and policies the House planned to embark on, to meet the basic needs of the people, improve public welfare and sectoral development 
 Developing Minimum Infrastructure Bills, a broad and integrated legislative master plan evolved to drive infrastructural development in Nigeria 
 Shut doors to executive interference in parliamentary affairs
 Regular exposure of ills in government, in so doing, unflinchingly engaging Ministers and other heads of government agencies through investigative hearings and public hearings
 Profound scrutiny of budgetary framework, making robust adjustments where necessary
 Forging effective and cordial relationship with the media and civil society groups to ensure the promotion of the young parliament 
 Strengthening of House committees and emboldening of committee heads to take on Ministers and agency heads on policy issues and level of budget implementation
 Regular interface with Auditor-General and Accountant-General of the Federation and Minister of Finance to scrutinize government books for immediate action
 Revitalization of plenary sessions which threw up healthy, electrified and animated debates with immense results. It is on record that Ghali's House plenary sessions remain the most vigorous and vibrant in this Fourth Republic and remarkable in the number of quality bills passed.
 Fashioning out a cohesive, inclusive, mutual, thinking and participatory House, richly endowed with ideas. The matchlessness about Na’Abba and his House was the ability to mobilize more than two-thirds majority at any given time
 Mobilization of more than 300 members out of 360 to overturn President Obasanjo's veto on bills such as NDDC, etcetera and so on. Na’Abba's House remains the only House that has been able to overturn a President's veto on a bill.
 Regular debate on the state of the nation. 2002 debate resulted in the House's far-reaching resolution to commence impeachment proceedings against President Obasanjo to tame him over his growing appetite for constitutional breaches. 
 Cataloguing of 32 impeachable offences of President Obasanjo. Na’Abba's House remains the only House that has so taken on the President in far reaching fashion towards checkmating civilian dictatorship and gross constitutional breaches.

The executive arm of government, particularly the presidency, did not approve of his leadership. Consequently, greater part of Na’Abba's tenure witnessed grand plots by the Presidency to oust him, so as to replace him with a compromising legislator. This severed the relationship between the House and the Presidency.  He survived till the end of his four-year tenure on June 3, 2003. In August 2002, the House gave president Olusegun Obasanjo an ultimatum to either resign or face impeachment action.

As speaker, Na’Abba said the House would not withdraw the resolution. Na'Abba was the leader of the impeachment movement. It was reported that Obasanjo gave members of the House inducements to bring charges against Na'Abba.

International parliamentary positions 
Although manifestly dynamic and proactive at home as speaker, Na’Abba ensured that he replicated the same at international level. This accounted for the numerous but particularly critical parliamentary positions he occupied at international level during his four-year stint as speaker. A checklist includes:

 Vice President, Conference of Speakers of West African Parliaments
 Vice President, Global Parliamentarians on Habitat
 Vice President, African Region, Commonwealth Parliamentary Association
 Vice President, African Parliamentary Union
 President Conference of Speakers of West African Parliaments
 President, African Region, Commonwealth Parliamentary Association
 President, African Parliamentary Union
 President, African Regional Council, Global Forum for Parliamentarian on Habitat

It is however on record that based on his leadership attributes, exceptional commitment to duty and towering performance and enhanced results, he was elevated from being the Vice President of the following regional parliamentary bodies - Conference of Speakers of West African Parliaments; African Region, Commonwealth Parliamentary Association and Africa Parliamentary Union - to president, all in 2000 and 2001. These offered him a rare opportunity to significantly redefine, reshape and drive African parliamentary diplomacy and development, fundamentally desired in the wake of the new millennium in 2000. As the President of the Commonwealth Parliamentary Association, Africa Region, he took Nigeria back to the body and thus Nigeria's name was removed from abeyance. Countries that are ruled by the military are put in abeyance by such bodies.

2003 Re-election bid 
In April 2003, he sought a re-election into the House of Representatives on the platform of People's Democratic Party. The Presidency that brazenly lost the battle of removing him as Speaker extended the animosity to his re-election bid.

The Presidency's fear was that given his level of performance in four years in the House and his high popularity rating, if he should be allowed to win the election to return to the House he would logically re-emerge Speaker. Essentially, this resulted in the regrettable conspiracy to ambush him to lose the election. This time again, the backlash of the perfidy expanded and consumed PDP in the state as the party lost to All Nigeria People's Party.

Political philosophy and re-alignment 
Na’Abba's idea of a political party is one founded on:

 Justice, fairness, equity, providing for mass participation and fundamentally operating on liberal and collaborative platform. 
 It also involves a platform that holds accountability and transparency in high premium, carrying all members along at all times.
 Boasting of manifestoes that are designed and implemented to meet the critical needs and aspirations of the people thereby engendering good governance and national development.

Following the manipulations orchestrated by some of the party leaders which resulted in his loss of 2003 National Assembly election and perceived growing injustice in the party at that time which made the party to fall far short of his idea of a political party as enumerated above, Na’Abba decided to leave the party in protest with other like minds for Action Congress of Nigeria in 2006. When it became obvious that the key leaders who perpetuated the injustice had begun to give way, he returned to PDP, three years later.

As an affirmed progressive politician, the obvious derailment of PDP yet again in 2014 as evidenced in the mass exodus of leaders from the party forced Na’Abba to leave the party after consulting widely and plausibly. He joined the All Progressives Congress (APC), a coalition political platform for politicians of progressive bent desirous of positive change. Predictably, APC has succeeded in displacing PDP at federal level and several states.

Awards 
In recognition of his outstanding record in politics, pioneering parliamentary independence and development of the legislature and profound defence of democracy, rule of law and the constitution, Na’Abba has bagged a flood-gate of awards from the government, civil society groups, organized labour, students unions, private business organizations, political associations and even foreign government agencies and so on. These are some of his awards:

 National Honors Award of Commander of the Order of the Federal Republic (CFR) awarded by Goodluck Jonathan, President of Nigeria in 2010
 Award for building a formidable foundation for legislative Arm of government awarded by the People's Democratic Party(PDP), the ruling party at that time
 Honorary Citizen of Kansas City, Missouri, USA 
 Man of Integrity Award by Students Union of University of Nigeria, Nsukka
 Award of Excellence for upholding the tenets of democracy in Nigeria by Abuja Council of Nigeria Union of Journalists (NUJ)
 Defender of democracy by Bayero University Students Union
 Appreciation and Commendation Award by Nigeria Association of Indigenous Petroleum Exporters and Importers
 Certificate of honour by Institute of Personnel Management of Nigeria
 Millennium Gold Award for youths development by International Youth Congress
 Pillar of Nigeria's Legislative Award by Law Students Society, University of Jos
 Millennium Hero Award by All Northern Youths Forum

References 

Speakers of the House of Representatives (Nigeria)
Living people
1964 births
People's Redemption Party politicians
Peoples Democratic Party members of the House of Representatives (Nigeria)
Politicians from Kano State
Action Congress of Nigeria politicians